Gastonia station is an Amtrak train station in Gastonia, North Carolina, United States.

History

The station was originally built in 1966 by Southern Railway, before being acquired by Norfolk Southern Railway. Previously, Amtrak's Gastonia stop was located on Air Line Avenue; however, it was moved in 1987 due to an effort to relocate the city's railroads. 

In January 2020, Amtrak began an eight-month project to improve the historically "bare-bones," in terms of amenities, facility. The project includes a new  concrete platform that is ADA compliant, railings, lighting and signage, along with accessible ramps and parking stalls; the station will have a new accessible entrance with a power-operable door, and renovate the waiting room and restroom.

Services
The station opens one hour before train arrival time and closes one half hour after train departure. The station facility has a heated waiting room with restroom.

References

External links 
 

Gastonia Station – NC By Train
Gastonia Amtrak Station (USA Rail Guide -- Train Web)

Buildings and structures in Gaston County, North Carolina
Amtrak stations in North Carolina
Stations along Southern Railway lines in the United States
Transportation in Gaston County, North Carolina